Hara-Kiri was a monthly French satirical magazine, first published in 1960, the precursor to Charlie Hebdo. It was created by Georges Bernier, François Cavanna and Fred Aristidès. A weekly counterpart, Hara-Kiri Hebdo, was first published in 1969.

Contributors included Melvin Van Peebles, Reiser, Roland Topor, Moebius, Wolinski, Gébé, Cabu, Fournier, Jean-Pierre Bouyxou and Willem. In 1966 it published Les Aventures de Jodelle, drawn by Guy Peellaert 

Hara-Kiri editions, subtitled "Journal bête et méchant" ("Stupid and nasty newspaper"), were constantly aiming at established social structures, be they political parties or institutions like the Church or the state. In 1961 and 1966 the monthly magazine was temporarily banned by the French government.

Hara-Kiri Hebdo becomes Charlie Hebdo
In November 1970, following the death of Charles de Gaulle at his home in Colombey-les-Deux-Églises, the weekly Hara-Kiri Hebdo bore the headline « Bal tragique à Colombey : 1 mort » (Eng: "Tragic ball in Colombey: 1 death").

By way of contradistinction, the choice of the title refers to the far greater loss of life the same month: a fire at a discothèque in which 146 mostly young people died.  The government felt this editorial choice was an offence of lèse-majesté against the deceased President, and its then minister of the interior Raymond Marcellin ordered an immediate and permanent ban on publicity and on sale to minors.

Charlie Hebdo was started immediately afterwards. Charlie in the title refers to General de Gaulle (said Georges Wolinski); but it was also the name of another magazine from Éditions du Square Charlie Mensuel, named after the character Charlie Brown from Charles M. Schulz's Peanuts.

References

 Stéphane Mazurier, "Hara-Kiri de 1960 à 1970, un journal d’avant-garde", Histoires littéraires, No. 26, 2006.

1960 establishments in France
1970 disestablishments in France
Magazines established in 1960
Magazines disestablished in 1970
Defunct magazines published in France
Satirical magazines published in France
Comics magazines published in France
Monthly magazines published in France
Weekly magazines published in France
French-language magazines
Controversies in France
Censorship in France
Censorship in the arts
Censored comics
Obscenity controversies in literature
Obscenity controversies in comics
Charlie Hebdo
1960 comics debuts
Religious controversies in literature
Religious controversies in comics
Comics controversies
Satirical comics
French political satire